Andrew Dick may refer to:

 Andrew Dick (cricketer), Australian cricketer who played for Victoria
 Andrew Dick (footballer) (born 1986), English born Scottish football midfielder
 Andrew Dick (wrestler) (born 1976), Nigerian amateur freestyle wrestler
Andy Dick (born 1965), American comedian and actor

See also
Andrew Dick-Lauder